In the fictional world of The Librarian, a series of made-for-TV movies from TNT, there exists a secret society of Librarians who are the guardians of a wide range of magical and mythical relics.

About the Librarians
The Librarians are a fictional secret society that have existed as an order for centuries, and often undertake global-spanning adventures to recover items to keep them safe from people who would use them for evil purposes. The Librarians wish only to increase their knowledge, and use the relics for the betterment of mankind. They have been fighting a secret war with the Serpent Brotherhood since at least the fall of the Library of Alexandria many centuries ago.

Simone Renoir states that all vampires are aware of the Librarians and their battle against evil.

Librarians of note
There have been many librarians of note over the centuries, including;

 Judson aka The Scholar - The greatest Librarian of all, legend says that over two thousand years ago he built the Library and is the keeper of its secrets. He was known as Yahuda which is the Hebrew name for Judson.
Enoch the Elder- Mentioned in Librarians Season 3; episode "Trial of the Triangle".
Balthus and Zharradan - aka "the Westphalian Brothers". Identical twins chosen simultaneously by the Library in the 5th Century. Eventually the brothers became jealous of one another, each believing himself more suited to be the Librarian. Their rivalry led to war, which ultimately plunged the world into the Dark Ages and nearly destroyed the Library. (Presumably, this is when the split off occurred that gave rise to the Serpent Brotherhood). 
Eldred the Truly Wonderful - A historical Librarian who was considered great. Possibly instrumental in restoring order after the war between the twin brothers.
 Unknown His painting seen next to Eldred's. Judging by his style of dress he can be placed in Europe during the 1600s.
 Zelpha the Forgetful - The Librarian of the late 1700s who first established the Archive. "Eccentric in her working habits", employed a filing system of nearly incomprehensible clues in a scavenger hunt style, for which Cassandra nicknames her "Zelpha the Infuriating". Mentioned only once in the episode "And a Town Called Feud". She gave Jenkins/Galahad a stack of letters "on Shrove Tuesday 1782". The letters were correspondence between the Westphalian Brothers (AKA Balthus and Zharradan), which chronicled the genesis of the war between them.
 Teddy Chislington - The Librarian in the mid-1800s. Brought the remnants of the Library of Alexandria back to the Library and created the Bermuda Triangle to hide the Eye of Ra.
 Darrington Dare - The Librarian of the late 1800s, who claims that Arthur Conan Doyle used him as a model for Sherlock Holmes. Darrington Dare is Flynn's ultimate hero. Due to a time slip/crossover incident, they get to meet and work together in "The Bleeding Crown". When Darrington learns there are currently three other Librarians besides Flynn, he tells Flynn the history of the Westphalian Brothers, and emphatically urges Flynn to fire the other Librarians before it's too late.
 Edward Wilde - The previous Librarian before Flynn. He faked his own death to steal the Spear of Destiny.
 Flynn Carsen - The current Librarian. He is a highly intelligent and resourceful adventurer.

Other Library staff
 Charlene - She works in the Library and was Guardian (bodyguard) to a previous Librarian.
 Nicole Noone - She works for the Library and served as Guardian to two Librarians (Edward Wilde and Flynn Carsen).
 Eve Baird - She works for the Library and served as Guardian first to Flynn Carsen and then to three potential Librarians (Jacob Stone, Cassandra Cillian, and Ezekiel Jones).
 Leo - He worked in the Library, and was supposed to put the Shroud of Turin away.
 Jenkins/Galahad - He is the caretaker of the Portland, Oregon annex of the 'Library'.

The Serpent Brotherhood
The Serpent Brotherhood are a splinter group of the Librarians, who separated off back when the "Library" entrance was in Alexandria in ancient times. The Brotherhood wished to use the powers of the artifacts to rule the world and this disagreement led to a secret war between the Librarians and the Brotherhood who incited the riot that led to the destruction of the entrance to Library (in Alexandria). More recently, in 2004 the Brotherhood worked with former Librarian, Edward Wilde, to unsuccessfully steal the Spear of Destiny, to take control of the world. In 2014 they attempted to seize control of the 'Library' forcing Judson and Charlene to sever the link between the 'Library' and the New York Public Library. The current leader of the Brotherhood is Lancelot du Lac.

The Brotherhood take their name from the serpent that brought knowledge to Adam and Eve.

About the Library
The 'Library' has existed at least since ancient times, and houses both magical and powerful relics. The Library itself appears to be sentient (or semi-sentient) and sends out invitations to prospective Librarians and Guardians.

The 'Library' exists in its own pocket universe and in ancient times the entrance to the 'Library' was located in the Library of Alexandria, and the entrance had been located in the New York Public Library in New York City until 2014.

The 'Library' has a large collections annex, and a service entrance. Although there can only ever be one entrance to the main 'Library', there are sites around the world that provide entrances to the Library Annex, giving access to the books of the Library, but not to the relics.

Library of Alexandria entrance
The entrance to the 'Library' that was connected to the Library of Alexandria was destroyed when the Serpent Brotherhood incited a riot that destroyed it (sometime before the 8th Century). It has yet to be revealed where the entrance to the 'Library' was housed between the 8th century and the 1890s when the New York Metropolitan Public Library was built.

New York Metropolitan Public Library entrance
The New York Metropolitan Public Library provided an entrance to the 'Library' until 2014. The entrance was behind a hidden door disguised as a shelf of books. When Judson was first showing Flynn the entrance, he gave Flynn a clue as to how to open the door by quoting the lines "If we shadows have offended, think but this and all is mended", to which Flynn replied "That you have but slumber'd here, while these visions did appear", and immediately realised that the way to open the secret door was to pull on a copy of A Midsummer Night's Dream, the romantic comedy by William Shakespeare. Behind the secret door is an elevator shaft which can only be accessed by two marines opening two locks simultaneously. When Flynn remarked that the double lock was the same as is used on bases with nuclear weapons, Judson verified this and said they copied it from the library.

In the opening episode of The Librarians, in 2014,  Judson and Charlene were forced to sever the link between the 'Library' and the New York Public Library when it was invaded by the Serpent Brotherhood.

Portland, Oregon annex
The Library Annex (which gives access to the books of the Library, but not to the relics) in Portland, Oregon, is run by Jenkins and is being used by three potential Librarians (Jacob Stone, Cassandra Cillian, and Ezekiel Jones) and their Guardian (Eve Baird) as a base of operations.

In the catalogue
The collection of relics stored in the library includes:

References

Librarian, The
Mythology